KMYZ-FM (104.5 MHz) is a commercial radio station located in Tulsa, Oklahoma, and licensed to Pryor, Oklahoma. KMYZ-FM airs an alternative rock format branded as "Z104.5 The Edge".  Its studios are located at the CityPlex Towers in South Tulsa and its transmitter is in southeast Tulsa County along the Muskogee Turnpike.

History
KMYZ-FM signed on the air in 1969 as KKMA, a country music station located in downtown Pryor, Oklahoma. In the late '70s, the country format was dropped for album rock. KMYZ's studios moved to Tulsa in the early '80s and its format evolved to classic rock by 1985. It later changed to CHR/Adult Top-40 as "Z-104.5". The station started leaning towards a rock direction in its CHR format beating then crosstown CHR rival KAYI (Now KHTT). Airchecks of this timeframe can be found at http://www.edgetulsa.com. KMYZ-FM later evolved into a straight ahead Rock presentation to compete against crosstown Rocker KMOD-FM. On February 27, 1995, the station changed to a Modern rock/Alternative format as "Z-104.5 The Edge" which still airs to this day.

References

External links
Stephens Media Group Oklahoma Stations
Z-104.5 official website

MYZ-FM
Modern rock radio stations in the United States
Radio stations established in 1969
1969 establishments in Oklahoma